Phiale is a genus of jumping spiders that was first described by Carl Ludwig Koch in 1846. P. albovittata has been considered a junior synonym of Freya perelegans since 2006.

Species
 it contains twenty-five species, found in the Caribbean, South America, Costa Rica, Guatemala, Mexico, and Panama:
Phiale aschnae Makhan, 2006 – Suriname
Phiale bipunctata Mello-Leitão, 1947 – Brazil
Phiale bisignata (F. O. Pickard-Cambridge, 1901) – Mexico, Guatemala
Phiale bryantae Roewer, 1951 – Antigua and Barbuda (Antigua)
Phiale bulbosa (F. O. Pickard-Cambridge, 1901) – Panama
Phiale crocea C. L. Koch, 1846 – Panama to Brazil
Phiale cruentata (Walckenaer, 1837) – Brazil, French Guiana
Phiale cubana Roewer, 1951 – Cuba
Phiale elegans (F. O. Pickard-Cambridge, 1901) – Panama
Phiale formosa (Banks, 1909) – Costa Rica
Phiale geminata (F. O. Pickard-Cambridge, 1901) – Panama
Phiale gratiosa C. L. Koch, 1846 (type) – Brazil, Paraguay, Argentina
Phiale guttata (C. L. Koch, 1846) – Costa Rica to Paraguay
Phiale huadquinae Chamberlin, 1916 – Peru
Phiale longibarba (Mello-Leitão, 1943) – Brazil
Phiale mimica (C. L. Koch, 1846) – Brazil
Phiale ortrudae Galiano, 1981 – Ecuador
Phiale pallida (F. O. Pickard-Cambridge, 1901) – Guatemala
Phiale quadrimaculata (Walckenaer, 1837) – Brazil
Phiale radians (Blackwall, 1862) – Brazil
Phiale roburifoliata Holmberg, 1875 – Argentina
Phiale rubriceps (Taczanowski, 1871) – French Guiana
Phiale septemguttata (Taczanowski, 1871) – French Guiana
Phiale tristis Mello-Leitão, 1945 – Argentina, Paraguay, Brazil
Phiale virgo C. L. Koch, 1846 – Suriname

References

External links
 Photographs of Phiale species
 Pictures of P. bulbosa
 Pictures of P. formosa
 Pictures of P. guttata 

Salticidae
Salticidae genera
Spiders of Central America
Spiders of North America
Spiders of South America
Taxa named by Carl Ludwig Koch